Christine Gomis (born 3 February 1968 in Paris, France) is a French basketball player. Gomis has had 72 selections for the French national  women's basketball team from 1991-1999.

External links 

  sports reference federation francaise de basket-ball

French women's basketball players
Basketball players from Paris
Living people
1968 births